Chiang Rak Noi station is a railway station in Chiang Rak Noi Sub-district, Bang Pa-in District, Phra Nakhon Si Ayutthaya. It is a class 2 railway station  from Bangkok railway station.

Train services 
 Ordinary No. 201/202 Bangkok- Phitsanulok- Bangkok
 Ordinary No. 207/208 Bangkok- Nakhon Sawan- Bangkok
 Ordinary No. 209/210 Bangkok- Ban Takhli- Bangkok
 Ordinary No. 211/212 Bangkok- Taphan Hin- Bangkok
 Ordinary No. 233/234 Bangkok- Surin- Bangkok
 Commuter No. 301/302 Bangkok- Lop Buri- Bangkok (weekends only)
 Commuter No. 303/304 Bangkok- Lop Buri- Bangkok (weekdays only)
 Commuter No. 305/306 Bangkok- Ayutthaya- Bangkok (weekdays only)
 Commuter No. 313/314 Bangkok- Ban Phachi Junction- Bangkok (weekdays only)
 Commuter No. 315/316 Bangkok- Lop Buri- Bangkok (weekdays only)
 Commuter No. 317/318 Bangkok- Lop Buri- Bangkok (weekdays only)
 Commuter No. 339/340 Bangkok- Kaeng Khoi Junction- Bangkok (weekdays only)
 Commuter No. 341/342 Bangkok- Kaeng Khoi Junction- Bangkok (weekdays only)
 Commuter No. 343/344 Bangkok- Kaeng Khoi Junction- Bangkok (weekends only)

References 
 
 

Railway stations in Thailand